Humayunpur is an urbanized village in South Delhi, India. It is located next to Safdarjung Enclave. The NCC HQ is situated in Humayunpur.

References

Villages in South Delhi district